Below is a list of newspapers published in Latvia.

National newspapers 
Diena
Dienas bizness (lv)
Ir
Latvijas Avīze
Latvijas Vēstnesis
Neatkarīgā Rīta Avīze

Tabloids 
Vakara Ziņas

Russian newspapers 
Argumenty i Fakty
Segodnya

English newspapers 
The Baltic Times

Regional newspapers 
Alūksnes Ziņas
Bauskas Dzīve
Brīvā Daugava
Druva
Dundadznieks
Dzirkstele
Ezerzeme
Iecavas Ziņas
Jūrmalas Ziņas
Kursas Laiks
Kurzemes Reklāma
Kurzemes Vārds
Kurzemnieks
Latgales Laiks
Ludzas Zeme
Malienas Ziņas
Neatkarīgās Tukuma Ziņas
Novadnieks
Novaya Gazeta
Ogres Vēstis
Ogres Ziņas
Olaines Avīze
Olaines Balss
Rēzeknes Vēstis
Rīgas Apriņķa Avīze
Saldus Zeme
Siguldas Elpa
Staburags
Stars
Talsu Vēstis
Tukuma Ziņotājs
Vaduguns
Ventas Balss
Zemgales Ziņas
Ziemeļlatvija

Free regional newspapers 
Čekeme Avīze - Liepāja

Latvia, List of newspapers published in
Newspapers